Hometown Guitar is the thirty-fourth studio album by Chet Atkins.  It peaked at number 17 on the Billboard Country Albums chart.

Track listing

Side one
 "Big Daddy"
 "Sittin' on Top of the World" (Sam Chatmon)
 "Huntin' Boots"
 "Blue Guitar"
 "Cattle Call"
 "Back to Old Smokey Mountain"

Side two
 "Sweet Georgia Brown" (Maceo Pinkard, Kenneth Casey)
 "Blue Angel"
 "Get on with It"
 "Reed's Ramble"
 "Pickin' Pot Pie"
 "The Last Thing on My Mind"

Personnel
Chet Atkins – guitar
Sonny Osbourne – banjo
Engineered by Bill Vandevort

External links
 Chet Atkins Official Website discography

1968 albums
Chet Atkins albums
Albums produced by Chet Atkins
Albums produced by Bob Ferguson (music)
RCA Records albums